The 2018–19 Brisbane Roar FC season was the club's 14th season participating in the A-League and in the FFA Cup for the fifth time.

Players

Squad information

Transfers

Transfers in

Transfers out

From youth squad

Contract extensions

Technical staff

Squad statistics

Appearances and goals

 

|-
|colspan="14"|Players no longer at the club

† = Scholarship or NPL/NYL-listed player

Pre-season and friendlies

Friendlies

Competitions

Overall

A-League

League table

Results summary

Results by round

Matches

FFA Cup

References

External links
 Official Website

2018–19 A-League season by team
Brisbane Roar FC seasons